Joseph Mullins may refer to:

 Joe Mullins (born 1937), Canadian athlete